Coneto de Comonfort is one of the 39 municipalities of Durango, in north-western Mexico. The municipal seat lies at Coneto de Comonfort. The municipality covers an area of 1324.9 km². As of 2015, the municipality had a total population of 4,390. The town of Coneto de Comonfort has a population of 858. Other than the town of Coneto de Comonfort, the municipality had 64 localities, the largest of which (with 2010 population in parentheses) was: Nogales (1,117), classified as rural.

References

Municipalities of Durango